Justizvollzugsanstalt Celle (or JVA Celle) is a high-security prison located in Lower Saxony, Germany. It institutionalizes male adult prisoners serving sentences from 14 years to life. The prison was built from 1710 to 1724. It was designed by Johann Caspar Borchmann, and it is considered the oldest functioning prison in Germany.

References

External links 
 

Prisons in Germany
Buildings and structures in Celle (district)
Buildings and structures completed in 1724